Leslie Roy Marston was an American Bishop of the Free Methodist Church of North America, elected in 1935.  He also served as President of the National Association of Evangelicals.

References
 Leete, Frederick DeLand, Methodist Bishops.  Nashville, The Methodist Publishing House, 1948.

Free Methodist bishops
American Methodist bishops
Year of birth missing
Year of death missing
20th-century Methodist bishops